Christine Lehner (born 1952) is an American novelist and short story writer.

Early life and education 
Lehner was born in 1952 in Massachusetts.  She attended the College of Creative Studies at the University of California, Santa Barbara and graduated with a B.A. in literature in 1973.  While at UC Santa Barbara, she was a student of Marvin Mudrick.  She later attended Brown University, where she graduated in 1977 with a M.A. in creative writing in 1977.

Literary career 
Lehner published her first novel, Expecting, in 1982.  She published her second work, What to Wear to See the Pope , over twenty years later in 2004.  Her most recent work, Absent a Miracle, was released in 2009.

In 2010, Lehner was selected as a member of the first class of State University of New York at Purchase's Fellows of the Writing Center.

Personal life 
Lehner married fellow College of Creative Studies and University of California, Santa Barbara alumni Jeffrey Richardson Hewitt in 1976. The couple had two children, Reine and Tristram, before divorcing in 2001. She currently resides in Hastings-on-Hudson, New York.

Lehner and Hewitt endowed the Brancart Fiction Prize and the Richardson Poetry Prize for the College of Creative Studies at UC Santa Barbara in honor of their grandmothers.

Lehner has taken to bee keeping, founding Let it Bee Apiaries in 2004.

References

External links 
 
 Sort Quench & Dump - Personal blog
 Let it Bee Apiaries

20th-century American novelists
21st-century American novelists
American women novelists
American women short story writers
University of California, Santa Barbara alumni
Brown University alumni
1952 births
Living people
Novelists from Massachusetts
20th-century American women writers
21st-century American women writers
20th-century American short story writers
21st-century American short story writers